Hastings Ndlovu ( 2 February 1961 - 16 June 1976) was a schoolboy who was killed in the Soweto uprising against the apartheid system in South Africa.

Life
On 16 June 1976, when the police from the Orlando Police Station led by Colonel Kleingeld opened fire on Soweto students protesting against the imposition of Afrikaans instruction in school, he was the first to be hit. Ndlovu's death was not as widely publicised as Hector Pieterson's because no photographer was present to record it. Kleingeld said at the Cillie Commission that Hastings "was inciting the crowd". There is some doubt as to who was the first fatality, as Pieterson was pronounced dead upon arrival at the clinic, whereas Ndlovu died from bullet wounds to the head shortly after being brought to the clinic.

Ndlovu was survived by his parents, three sisters and brother. His sisters left the country soon after June 16, but returned to Johannesburg a few  years later.

Legacy
Ndlovu was buried with Pieterson at Avalon Cemetery in Johannesburg. His house in Soweto had a blue plaque attached to it on 16 June 2012 to commemorate his sacrifice.

References

1961 births
1976 deaths
Anti-apartheid activists
People from Soweto
People shot dead by law enforcement officers in South Africa
Murdered South African children
Murdered students
Protest-related deaths